Ghasulah also spelled Ghassuleh, is a Syrian village located in Markaz Rif Dimashq, Douma District. According to the Syria Central Bureau of Statistics (CBS), Ghasulah had a population of 3,272 in the 2004 census.

References

Populated places in Markaz Rif Dimashq District